Eagris sabadius is a species of butterfly in the family Hesperiidae. It is found in Uganda, Kenya, Tanzania, Malawi, Zambia, Zimbabwe and on Madagascar, Mauritius, Réunion, the Seychelles and the Comoro Islands. The habitat consists of montane forests, forests and forest margins.

The larvae feed on Grewia similis, Grewia forbesii, Hibiscus rosasinensis, Dombeya burgessiae and Rhus species.

Subspecies
Eagris sabadius sabadius (Mauritius, Reunion)
Eagris sabadius aldabranus Fryer, 1912 (Seychelles: Aldabra)
Eagris sabadius andracne (Boisduval, 1833) (Madagascar)
Eagris sabadius astoria Holland, 1896 (eastern Uganda, central and western Kenya, northern Tanzania)
Eagris sabadius comorana Evans, 1937 (Comoro Islands)
Eagris sabadius isabella Turlin, 1995 (Comoro Islands)
Eagris sabadius maheta Evans, 1937 (Seychelles)
Eagris sabadius ochreana Lathy, 1901 (Malawi, north-eastern Zambia, Tanzania, south-eastern Kenya)

References

Butterflies described in 1832
Tagiadini